The 98th District of the Iowa House of Representatives in the state of Iowa.

Current elected officials
Mary Wolfe is the representative currently representing the district.

Past representatives
The district has previously been represented by:
 Dewey Goode, 1971–1973
 Laverne Schroeder, 1973–1985
 Joan Hester, 1985–1993
 Philip Wise, 1993–2003
 Gerald D. Jones, 2003–2007
 Greg Forristall, 2007–2013
 Mary Wolfe, 2013–present

References

098